Ben T H So (born 25 May 1990) is an apprentice horse racing jockey. He has had 19 victories in 2010/11, which brings his career total to 48. A tally of 12 wins in 2013/14 took his overall Hong Kong win total to 107.

Major wins 
 HKG3 Premier Plate - Mr Medici (2009/10)

Performance

See also 
 The Hong Kong Jockey Club

References 

Hong Kong jockeys
1990 births
Living people